The U.S. Immigration and Customs Enforcement (ICE) is a federal law enforcement agency under the U.S. Department of Homeland Security. ICE's stated mission is to protect the United States from the cross-border crime and illegal immigration that threaten national security and public safety.

The ICE mission is executed through the enforcement of more than 400 federal statutes and focuses on customs violations, immigration enforcement, preventing terrorism and combating the illegal movement of people and goods. ICE has two primary and distinct law enforcement components, namely, Homeland Security Investigations (HSI) and Enforcement and Removal Operations (ERO); in addition to three supporting divisions: Management & Program Administration, Office of Principal Legal Advisor (OPLA) and Office of Professional Responsibility (OPR).

Enforcement and Removal Operations (ERO), which primarily deals with the deportation and removal of undocumented non-citizens, is among the most public and contentious function of ICE. ERO maintains the custodial facilities used to detain people that are illegally present in the United States. In interior offices, ERO officers primarily conduct targeted enforcement operations to apprehend aliens engaged in serious criminal activity. For example, in fiscal year 2020, 90% of those aliens apprehended by ERO had criminal convictions or pending charges at the time of their administrative arrest. This FY 2020 arrest statistic includes 1,800 homicide related offenses, 1,600 kidnappings, 3,800 robberies, 37,000 assaults, and 10,000 sex crimes. At border offices ERO officers receive and detain illegal immigrants apprehended by Border Patrol. Illegal immigrants apprehended at the border have significantly lower levels of criminal history than those arrested by ERO in the interior of the United States.

ICE maintains domestic offices throughout the United States and attachés at major U.S. diplomatic missions overseas. ICE personnel (special agents and officers) do not patrol American borders; rather, that role is performed by the United States Border Patrol. ERO and HSI operate as two independent law enforcement agencies and have completely separate mission statements. HSI is focused on the disruption of transnational crime, where as ERO is responsible for the apprehension, detention and removal of illegal immigrants.

The Acting Director is Tae Johnson. The agency has not had a Senate-confirmed director since Sarah Saldaña stepped down on January 20, 2017.

History

U.S. Immigration and Customs Enforcement was formed under the Homeland Security Act of 2002, following the events of September 11, 2001. With the establishment of the Department of Homeland Security, the functions and jurisdictions of several border and revenue enforcement agencies were combined and consolidated into U.S. Immigration and Customs Enforcement. Consequently, ICE is the largest investigative arm of the Department of Homeland Security and the second largest contributor to the FBI's Joint Terrorism Task Force.

The agencies that were either moved entirely or merged in part into ICE included the criminal investigative and intelligence resources of the United States Customs Service, the criminal investigative, detention and deportation resources of the Immigration and Naturalization Service, and the Federal Protective Service. The Federal Protective Service was later transferred from ICE to the National Protection and Programs Directorate effective October 28, 2009. In 2003, Asa Hutchinson moved the Federal Air Marshals Service from the Transportation Security Administration (TSA) to ICE, but Michael Chertoff moved them back to the TSA in 2005.

The origins of HSI Special Agents date back to the formations of the United States Customs Service in 1789. The taxing of imports led to the creation of the Treasury Department and its sub-components (i.e. Division of Customs Chief).  Later, the Industrial Revolution led to some of the first immigration related laws targeting forced labor, human trafficking and child exploitation.

Organization
U.S. Immigration and Customs Enforcement is responsible for identifying and eliminating border, economic, transportation, and infrastructure security vulnerabilities. There is an estimate of about 20,000 ICE employees in approximately 400 offices within the United States and 53 countries.

The organization is composed of two law enforcement directorates (HSI and ERO) and several support divisions each headed by a director who reports to an Executive Associate Director. The divisions of ICE provide investigation, interdiction and security services to the public and other law enforcement partners in the federal and local sectors.

The Director of ICE is appointed at the sub-cabinet level by the President of the United States, confirmed by the U.S. Senate, and reports directly to the Secretary of Homeland Security.

Structure
Director (until July 2010 the title had been "Assistant Secretary") - Tae Johnson
Deputy Director - Patrick J. Lechleitner
Chief of Staff - Timothy Perry
Enforcement and Removal Operations - Acting Executive Associate Director Corey A. Price
Removal Division
Secure Communities and Enforcement Division
Immigration Health Services Division
Mission Support Division
Detention Management Division
Local Field Offices
Homeland Security Investigations - Acting Executive Associate Director Steve K. Francis
Domestic Operations Division
Intelligence Division
International Operations Division
Mission Support
National Intellectual Property Rights Coordination Center
National Security Investigations Division
Management and Administration - Executive Associate Director Staci Barrera
Office of Professional Responsibility - Associate Director Waldemar Rodriguez
Office of the Principal Legal Advisor - Principal Advisor John D. Trasviña

Homeland Security Investigations (HSI)

HSI is the primary investigative arm of Department of Homeland Security and consists of more than 10,300 employees who are assigned to over 210 cities throughout the U.S. and 80 international offices in 53 countries across the world. Approximately 7,100+ Special Agents (Criminal Investigators) are included among the over 10,300 HSI employees, making it the second largest investigative service in the United States, behind the Federal Bureau of Investigation.

HSI special agents investigate violations of more than 400 U.S. laws that threaten the national security of the United States such as counter-proliferation; counter-terrorism; human smuggling and trafficking; weapons smuggling and export enforcement; narcotics smuggling and trafficking; document and benefit fraud; the manufacturing, sale, and use of counterfeit immigration and identity documents; human rights violations; transnational gang activity; financial crimes, including money laundering and bulk cash smuggling; cyber crime; child exploitation and sex tourism; trade crimes such as commercial fraud and intellectual property theft; smuggling of counterfeit pharmaceuticals and other merchandise; mass-marketing fraud; art theft; international cultural property and antiquities crimes; and visa security. HSI agents can be requested to provide security for VIPs, and also augment the U.S. Secret Service during overtaxed times such as special security events and elections.

HSI was formerly known as the ICE Office of Investigations (OI). HSI special agents investigate the largest range of crimes and have the statutory authority to enforce the Immigration and Nationality Act (Title 8), U.S. customs laws (Title 19), general federal crimes (Title 18), the Controlled Substances Act (Title 21), as well as Titles 5, 6, 12, 22, 26, 28, 31, 46, 49, and 50 of the U.S. Code.

The Special Agents of Homeland Security Investigations (HSI) are Series 1811 Criminal Investigators, analogous to agencies such as the FBI, DEA, ATF, Secret Service, US Postal Inspection Service.

Domestic Operations-HSI
The largest cadre of Special Agents are located within Domestic Operations. HSI is primarily a criminal investigative agency and consistently leads the feds in arrests. In FY 2020, HSI Special Agents made 31,915 criminal arrests, rescued or identified 1,012 child exploitation victims, and seized $341 million worth of counterfeit goods, 6,195 lbs of fentanyl and $1.8 billion in currency & assets from criminal organizations.

HSI has played a key role in investigating and arresting citizens suspected of possessing and distributing child pornography.

In April 2006, ICE's Cyber Crimes Center, Child Exploitation Section, initiated an investigation into criminal organizations that distributed child pornography. The project, dubbed Operation Flicker, found that there were a number of government employees, including "dozens of Pentagon staff and contractors with high-level security clearance," who had downloaded child pornography.

Intelligence-HSI
The Office of Intelligence is a subcomponent of HSI that employs a variety of special agents and Intelligence Research Specialists to facilitate HSI's tactical and strategic intelligence demands. Collectively, these intelligence professionals collect, analyze, and disseminate intelligence for use by the operational elements of DHS. The Office of Intelligence works closely with the intelligence components of other federal, state, and local agencies. Many HSI field offices assign intelligence analysts to specific groups, such as financial crimes, counter-proliferation, narcotics, or document fraud; or they can be assigned to a residential intelligence unit, known as a Field Intelligence Group (FIG). HSI agents assigned to FIGs generally focus on Human Intelligence (HUMINT) collection.

International Operations-HSI

International Operations, formerly known as the Office of International Affairs (OIA), is a subcomponent of HSI with agents stationed in 60 locations around the world. HSI's foreign offices, known as Attaché Offices, work with foreign governments to identify and combat transnational criminal organizations before they threaten the United States. IO also facilitates domestic HSI investigations by providing intelligence from host countries, conducting collateral investigations, and facilitating international investigations conducted by field offices within the United States.

Special Response Teams-HSI
Seventeen HSI field offices maintain a Special Response Team (SRT) that operates as a federal SWAT element for the office's area of responsibility (AOR). SRT was founded under the U.S. Customs Service as the Warrant Entry and Tactical Team (WETT) and were renamed to SRT in 1998. The SRT handles HSI's high-risk arrest and search warrants, barricaded subjects, rural area operations, VIP protection, sniper coverage for high-risk operations, and security for National Security Events. HSI's active SRTs are located in Tampa, Miami, Arizona (Phoenix), New Orleans, Houston, New York, Boston, Dallas, Los Angeles, San Antonio, San Juan, Detroit, San Francisco, El Paso, Chicago, San Diego and Washington, D.C. There is also a team of instructors and coordinators stationed full-time in Columbus, Georgia. These teams primarily deploy to handle high-risk operations, but also assist in events such as Hurricane Katrina, the Haiti earthquake 2010, and other natural disasters around the globe.

SRT is a collateral duty open to HSI special agents assigned to an office with a certified team. To qualify, candidates must pass a physical fitness test, qualify with multiple firearms by shooting 90% or better in full tactical gear, and pass an oral interview process. If a candidate passes these stages and is voted on the local team, they are then designated "Green Team" members and allowed to train with the certified team members. Green Team members are eventually sent to the SRT Initial Certification Course at the Office of Firearms and Tactical Programs, Tactical Operations Unit (OFTP/TOU) Fort Benning, Georgia, where they must pass additional physical fitness, firearms, scenario-based and written assessments. Out of approximately 7,100 special agents, there are currently only approximately 300 certified SRT members nationwide.

HSI SRTs often conduct training exercises with various federal, state and local teams, and also assist other teams during national events or large-scale operations that require multiple high-risk scenarios to be conducted simultaneously. The working relationship between the SRTs and the U.S. Department of Defense's U.S. Special Operations Command has led to SOCOM providing the SRTs with excess Mine Resistant Ambush Protected vehicles (MRAPs), firearms, and other gear designed for use by U.S. Special operations forces.

Enforcement and Removal Operations (ERO)

ERO is responsible for enforcing the nation's immigration laws and ensuring the departure of removable immigrants from the United States. ERO uses its detention and deportation officers to identify, arrest, and remove immigrants who violate U.S. immigration law. Deportation officers are responsible for the transportation and detention of immigrants in ICE custody to include the removal of immigrants to their country of origin. Deportation officers arrest immigrants for violations of U.S. immigration law, monitor cases during deportation proceedings, supervise released immigrants, and remove immigrants from the United States.

Deportation officers operate strategically placed Fugitive Operations Teams whose function is to locate, apprehend, and remove immigrants who have absconded from immigration proceedings and remain in the United States with outstanding warrants for deportation. Due to limited staffing, ERO Fugitive Operations typically target illegal immigrants with a history of serious criminal convictions (i.e. homicide, sexual assaults, aggravated felonies). ERO Officers do not randomly target illegal immigrants for detention and civil arrest due to current case law and internal policies.

ERO manages the Secure Communities program which identifies removable immigrants located in jails and prisons. Fingerprints submitted as part of the normal criminal arrest and booking process will automatically check both the Integrated Automatic Fingerprint Identification System (IAFIS) of the FBI's Criminal Justice Information Services (CJIS) Division and the Automated Biometric Identification System (IDENT) of the Department of Homeland Security's US-VISIT Program.

ERO was formerly known as the Office of Detention and Removal Operations (DRO).

Other ICE Divisions
The Office of State, Local and Tribal Coordination (OSLTC) is ICE's primary outreach and communications component for state, local and tribal stakeholders. It is responsible for building and improving relationships, and coordinating activities with state, local, territorial, and tribal law enforcement agencies and through public engagement. It also fosters and sustains relationships with federal, state and local government officials and coordinates ICE ACCESS programs (Agreements of Cooperation in Communities to Enhance Safety and Security).

The Office of the Principal Legal Advisor (OPLA) provides legal advice, training and services to support the ICE mission and defends the interests of the United States in the administrative and federal courts.

The Office of Professional Responsibility is responsible for investigating allegations of misconduct involving employees of ICE.

ICE Air is the aviation division of ICE that charters aircraft or books commercial flights to send deportees back to their home countries. There are 10 aircraft used to send deportees and has a working list of 185 countries. Deportees have legs and arms secured while boarding, handcuffs are removed during flight and all shackles removed upon disembarking.

ICE Health Service Corps (IHSC) is a division that is responsible for providing direct patient care to approximately 13,500 detainees housed in 21 detention facilities throughout the nation. Their stated mission is to provide the best care to those in ICE custody, practicing on the core values of Integrity, Commitment, Accountability, Service, and Excellence. The IHSC team is made up of around 1,000 members that consist of US Public Health Service Commissioned Corps officers, healthcare professionals, and federal civil service workers.

Former units
The Federal Air Marshal Service (FAMS) was aligned into ICE shortly after the creation of the Department of Homeland Security. On October 16, 2005, Homeland Security Secretary Michael Chertoff officially approved the transfer of the Federal Air Marshal Service from the Bureau of Immigration & Customs Enforcement (ICE) to the TSA as part of a broader departmental reorganization to align functions consistent with the Department of Homeland Security (DHS) "Second Stage Review" findings for:

consolidating and strengthening aviation law enforcement and security at the Federal level;
creating a common approach to stakeholder outreach; and
improving the coordination and efficiency of aviation security operations.

As part of this realignment, the Director of the Federal Air Marshal Service also became the Assistant Administrator for the TSA Office of Law Enforcement (OLE), which houses nearly all TSA law enforcement services.

The Federal Protective Service (FPS) was moved from the General Services Administration (GSA) to ICE upon the creation of the Department of Homeland Security (DHS). The FPS was later moved out of ICE to the National Protection Programs Directorate.

Originally a part of the U.S. Customs Service's Office of Investigations, the Office of Air and Marine (then called the Air and Marine Interdiction Division) was transferred to ICE in 2003 during the creation of the Department of Homeland Security, becoming the Office of Air and Marine Operations. Due in part to a 500 million dollar budgetary dispute between CBP and ICE, in 2004 ICE Air and Marine Operations was transferred to U.S. Customs and Border Protection. CBP Air and Marine still works closely with ICE to support the agency's domestic and international law enforcement operations.

The Office of Detention Policy and Planning was responsible developing and maintaining ICE's National Detention Standards, which set out detailed rules for how immigration detainees were to be treated differently than criminal inmates. In April 2017, President Donald Trump decided to close the office and to stop including the standards in new jail contracts.

Assistant Secretaries and Directors

Training

Newly hired ICE law enforcement personnel receive their training at the Federal Law Enforcement Training Centers (FLETC) in Glynco, Georgia. FLETC is the largest law enforcement training facility in the United States. To meet division specific academic and practical instruction, the ICE academies vary in length from 4 to 6 months depending on the position. Furthermore, following graduation, all ICE law enforcement personnel undergo additional post academy training, as well as career-continuous training.

HSI: HSI Special Agent trainees must complete the inter-agency Criminal Investigator Training Program (CITP) and the HSI Special Agent Training Course (HSI SAT). HSI special agents also receive significantly advanced training regarding U.S. customs law, warrant service, advanced tactics, undercover operations, criminal interrogation, weapons of mass destruction, and other subjects routinely encountered by HSI special agents in the field. HSI Special Agents typically complete CITP in conjunction with other agencies (i.e. Secret Service, Diplomatic Security Service, Bureau of Alcohol, Tobacco & Firearms, and various Office of Inspector Generals, etc.). However, the agency specific HSI SAT course is only attended by HSI trainees and focuses on customs & immigration related investigations.

ERO: ERO Officer trainees must complete the basic 13-week ERO academy. ERO deportation officers undergo several weeks of intensive Spanish language training prior to graduating.

Specific course curriculum is kept confidential, but both ERO Officers and HSI Special Agent new hires undergo training related to basic law enforcement tactics, immigration law, firearms training, emergency response driving, and Constitutional law.

HSI requests separation from ICE
In 2018, a total of 19 HSI Special Agents in Charge or SACs (who are the senior most officials in each investigative division) sent a letter to the DHS Secretary and asked to be formally separated from ICE. These 19 SACs explained that HSI's investigative mission was repeatedly being hamstrung by ICE's civil immigration enforcement mission. It appeared HSI Special Agents were routinely being confused for ERO Officers both by the public and state/local law enforcement agencies. These Senior Leaders requested HSI be restructured as a stand-alone agency analogous to the Secret Service. It was also stated "No U.S. Department of Justice law enforcement agency is paired with another disparate entity, i.e., the FBI is not paired with the Bureau of Prisons or DEA." This letter was ultimately ignored by the administration and resulted in no institutional changes.

Weapons and equipment
Since the agency's formation, a variety of weapons have been carried by its agents and officers.

Previously issued sidearms
Initially when the agency was formed in 2003, the sidearms issued to its agents and officers were the weapons issued by the legacy agencies: the U.S. Customs Service and the U.S. Immigration and Naturalization Service. The USCS issued sidearm was the Glock 19 9mm pistol. The I&NS issued sidearm was the Heckler & Koch USP Compact .40 caliber pistol. Both pistols were loaded with hollow-point rounds.

In 2009 the agency selected the SIG-Sauer P229 DAK .40 caliber pistol as its agency issued sidearm loaded with hollow-point rounds. This weapon stayed in service from 2009 to 2020.

Currently issued sidearms
The agency's current duty sidearm, is the SIG Sauer P320C (C for Carry) pistol, chambered in 9×19mm Parabellum hollow-point rounds, utilizing a striker-fired mechanism in lieu of a double action only hammer system.

The agency has a list of personally owned weapons that are authorized for duty and off duty carry. These weapons must be inspected and approved by the agency's firearms unit. The agent and/or officer must qualify with the weapon every three months.

Other firearms and non-lethal weapons
HSI special agents and ERO officers are trained on standard shoulder fired weapons that include the M4 carbine, chambered for 5.56×45mm NATO ammunition and the 12-gauge Remington 870 shotgun.

As non-lethal options, special agents and officers are armed with the expandable metal baton and pepper spray.

ICE in Hollywood
ICE special agents and officers have been depicted in a number of movies and documentaries.

HSI special agents
The Infiltrator (2016 film): Led by actor Bryan Cranston, this reflects the story of undercover Special Agent Robert Mazur and the risks he took to infiltrate violent drug cartels. He ultimately took down a bank that was laundering drug proceeds.

The Punisher (TV series): The lead female character portrays an HSI special agent.

Human Trafficking (miniseries): Led by Mira Sorvino, this TV series highlights the role of HSI special agents in combating sex trafficking.

The Crossing (TV series): People from a war torn future start showing up in a small town, prompting HSI special agents to investigate.

The Shield: Actress Laurie Holden played a prominent recurring role in the final season of The Shield as Special Agent Olivia Murray. In the final episode, the main character (Vic Mackey) is forced to work for ICE as part of his immunity agreement.

ERO officers
Immigration Nation: Takes an unprecedented look into ICE operations that target fugitives.

Transnational gangs

In February 2005, ICE began Operation Community Shield, a national law enforcement initiative that targets violent transnational street gangs through the use of ICE's broad law enforcement powers, including the unique and powerful authority to remove criminal immigrants, including illegal immigrants and legal permanent residents.

Immigration law
Immigration and Nationality Act Section 287(g) allows ICE to establish increased cooperation and communication with state, and local law enforcement agencies. Section 287(g) authorizes the Secretary of Homeland Security to enter into agreements with state and local law enforcement agencies, permitting designated officers to perform immigration law enforcement functions, pursuant to a Memorandum of Agreement (MOA), provided that the local law enforcement officers receive appropriate training and function under the supervision of sworn U.S. Immigration and Customs Enforcement officers. Under 287(g), ICE provides state and local law enforcement with the training and subsequent authorization to identify, process, and when appropriate, detain immigration offenders they encounter during their regular, daily law-enforcement activity.

The enforcement of immigration laws was historically supported by both major political parties within the United States. In 1995, then President Clinton (Democrat) stated the following in his State of the Union address: "All Americans, not only in the states most heavily affected, but in every place in this country, are rightly disturbed by the large numbers of illegal aliens entering our country. The jobs they hold might otherwise be held by citizens or legal immigrants. The public service they use impose burdens on our taxpayers. That's why our administration has moved aggressively to secure our borders more by hiring a record number of new border guards, by deporting twice as many criminal aliens as ever before, by cracking down on illegal hiring, by barring welfare benefits to illegal aliens. In the budget I will present to you we will try to do more to speed the deportation of illegal aliens who are arrested for crimes, to better identify illegal aliens in the workplace as recommended by the commission headed by former Congresswoman Barbara Jordan." Similarly in the 1996 State of the Union, then President Clinton (Democrat) stated the following: "But there are some areas that the federal government should not leave and should address and address strongly. One of these areas is the problem of illegal immigration. After years of neglect, this administration has taken a strong stand to stiffen the protection of our borders. We are increasing border controls by 50 percent. We are increasing inspections to prevent the hiring of illegal immigrants. And tonight, I announce I will sign an executive order to deny federal contracts to businesses that hire illegal immigrants. Let me be very clear about this: We are still a nation of immigrants; we should be proud of it. We should honor every legal immigrant here, working hard to become a new citizen. But we are also a nation of laws."

The 287(g) program is one of several ICE ACCESS (ICE "Agreements of Cooperation in Communities to Enhance Safety and Security") programs that increase collaboration between local law enforcement and immigration enforcement agents.

Between 2009 and 2016, the Barack Obama administration oversaw the deporting of a record 2.4 million undocumented immigrants who had illegally entered the United States, earning him the nickname "Deporter-In-Chief" by Janet Murguía, the president of National Council of La Raza. According to ICE data, about 40% of those deported by ICE in 2015 had no criminal conviction, while a majority of those convicted were guilty of minor charges. However, this statistic is misleading, as the way in how deportations were counted was changed under the Bush administration and continued under the Obama administration. Before, people caught crossing the southern border were simply bused back and were not counted as deportations. However, with the change, these people were fingerprinted and added to the deportation tally, giving the Obama administration a record number of deportations.

2021 Border Crisis
The U.S. Border Patrol apprehended more than 1.3 million illegal crossers in the first eight months of 2021; with a total of 1.6 million apprehensions in Fiscal Year 2021 (highest on record). This figure does not include a daily count of 1,000+ illegal migrants who successfully evade the Border Patrol. Many of these migrants are now coming from third party countries and filing asylum claims, which have log jammed DOJ administrative courts. Not all migrants come from just Mexico, many have come from other countries, such as: South America, Eastern Europe, Turkey and India. About two thirds were adults that arrived without children, and there was a record of 145,000 children that came to the U.S. alone. For example, in FY 2014 there were 56,912 asylum claims, which jumped to 142,760 in FY 2017 and are now even higher. Most illegal immigrants are simply released into the United States after minimal processing and ordered to report for a future court date. The majority of these released migrants eventually abscond from the court system and few abide by their final orders of removal if the asylum claims are rejected. Colloquially referred to as the Border Crisis, this has become a significant problem to solve for presidential administrations.

Cartel ambush of HSI Special Agent Jaime Zapata
In 2011, HSI Special Agents Jaime Zapata and Victor Avila, while working in Mexico to combat the flow of illicit narcotics, were ambushed by members of the Los Zetas drug cartel. Special Agent Zapata was killed while Special Agent Avila suffered life-threatening injuries. This was the first assassination of U.S. law enforcement agents since the infamous and gruesome murder of DEA Special Agent Enrique "Kiki" Camarena. Several members of the drug cartel were extradited to the U.S. and charged for the murders, however, the applicable statute revealed a potential loophole that made it inapplicable for violations committed outside the U.S. In November 2021, President Joe Biden signed the "Jaime Zapata & Victor Avila Federal Officers & Employees Protection Act," which helped extend legal protection to all U.S. personnel working overseas.

Kidnapping of HSI special agent
In 2005, an undercover HSI special agent was kidnapped in Medellin by members of a Colombian drug cartel, who held him responsible for a buy/bust operation that resulted in the seizure of 217 kilos of cocaine. The agent was moved to a "stash house" where he was assaulted and faced a "narco-trial." U.S. Embassy Officials eventually became aware of the kidnapping and notified senior officials within the Colombian government. The Colombian drug cartel members eventually obtained access to his hotel room safe and retrieved documents that revealed his true identity as a U.S. federal law enforcement officer. In order to avoid additional scrutiny from the Colombian Security Services, the drug cartel subsequently released the HSI special agent once they determined his true identity. The HSI agent eventually returned home safely and the subsequent investigation resulted in the extradition of several drug traffickers involved in the kidnapping.

ERO Detention centers

ICE ERO operates detention centers throughout the United States that detain illegal immigrants who are apprehended and placed into removal proceedings. About 34,000 people are held in immigration detention on any given day, in over 500 detention centers, jails, and prisons nationwide. Those detained are both illegal immigrants apprehended by ERO and other agencies such as Border Patrol.

Due to the United States detention bed quota, mandated by Congress, that number will increase rather than decrease. The quota mandates at least 34,000 beds available for immigrants on any given day. Under the Trump administration, the number of people being detained on any given day increased to 52,500 in early June 2019.

Corporate contracts
Engineering and construction firm Kellogg, Brown and Root (KBR) released a press statement on January 24, 2006, that the company had been awarded a no-bid contingency contract from the Department of Homeland Security to support its ICE facilities in the event of an emergency. The maximum total value of the contract is $385 million and consists of a one-year base period with four one-year options. KBR held the previous ICE contract from 2000 through 2005. The contract provides for establishing temporary detention and processing capabilities to expand existing ICE Detention and Removal Operations Program facilities in the event of an emergency influx of immigrants into the U.S., or to support the rapid development of new programs. The contract may also provide migrant detention support to other government organizations in the event of an immigration emergency, the company said.

Sexual abuse allegations
The Intercept published a report by the DHS Office of Inspector General revealing that 1,224 sexual abuse complaints while in immigration custody were filed between January 2010 and June 2017. Contrary to ICE's claims, only 2% of these complaints were investigated.

Forced sterilization allegations
In 2020, multiple human rights groups joined a whistleblower to accuse a private-owned U.S. immigration detention centre in Georgia of forcibly sterilizing women. The reports claimed a doctor conducted unauthorized medical procedures on women detained by ICE. The whistleblower, Dawn Wooten, was a nurse and former employee. She claims a high rate of sterilizations were performed on Spanish-speaking women and women who spoke various Indigenous languages common in Latin America. Wooten said the centre did not obtain proper consent for these surgeries, or lied to women about the medical procedures.

More than 40 women submitted testimony in writing to document these abuses, one attorney said. Jerry Flores, a faculty member at the University of Toronto Mississauga said the alleged treatment of women constituted a violation of human rights and genocide according to the standards of the United Nations. Just Security of the New York University School of Law said the U.S. bore "international responsibility for the forced sterilization of women in ICE detention". In September 2020, Mexico demanded more information from US authorities on medical procedures performed on migrants in detention centers, after allegations that six Mexican women were sterilized without their consent. Another women said she had undergone a gynecological operation, although there was nothing in her detention file to support she agreed to the procedure.

Allegations of pork and expired meals to Muslim detainees
In 2020, CNN reported that Muslim detainees at a federal immigration facility in Miami, Florida were repeatedly served pork or pork-based products against their religious beliefs, according to claims made by immigrant advocates. There are dozens of Muslim detainees at the facility for whom it is religiously forbidden to consume pork, civil rights groups said in a letter to ICE and federal oversight agencies. The Muslim detainees at the Krome detention facility in Miami were forced to accept pork because religiously compliant/halal meals that ICE served had been consistently rotten and expired. In one instance, the Chaplain at Krome's allegedly dismissed pleas from Muslim detainees for help, saying, "It is what it is."

A letter by civil rights lawyers stated "Many have suffered illness, like stomach pains, vomiting, and diarrhea, as a result." An ICE spokesman said, "Any claim that ICE denies reasonable and equitable opportunity for persons to observe their religious dietary practices is false." Representatives of the facility, including the chaplain did not respond to requests for comment. Previously in 2019, a Pakistani-born man with a valid American work permit was reportedly given nothing but pork sandwiches for six consecutive days.

Wrongful detention allegations
From 2012 to early 2018, ICE wrongfully arrested and detained 1,488 U.S. citizens, including many who spent months or years in immigration detention. A 2018 Los Angeles Times investigation found that ICE's reliance on incomplete and error-prone databases and lax investigations led to the erroneous detentions. From 2008 to 2018, ICE was sued for wrongful arrest by more than two dozen U.S. citizens, who had been detained for periods ranging from one day to over three years. Some of the wrongfully detained U.S. citizens had been arrested by ICE more than once. The inaccurate government data that ICE used had shown that both immigrants and U.S. citizens were both targets of being detained. In 2019, a U.S. citizen that was detained stated that he lost 26 pounds from the horrendous conditions that the detention center offered.

Separation of illegal migrant children from families by ICE ERO

As part of the 2018 Trump administration's zero tolerance policy, nearly 3,000 minors were separated from their parents, or the adults accompanying them, while trying to illegally cross the U.S.-Mexico border and placed in detention camps. Rolling Stone likened these centers to "prisons" while The Houston Chronicle reported that a movement swelled online to call them "concentration camps." Similarly, former First Lady of the United States Laura Bush compared the images of the centers to U.S. Japanese internment camps during the Second World War. 16 out of 34 of the centers located in Texas had previously been cited by Texas officials for more than 150 health violations. The former head of US Immigration and Customs Enforcement, John Sandweg, was critical of child separation, telling NBC News, "You could easily end up in a situation where the gap between a parent's deportation and a child's deportation is years," and that many children might never see their parents again.

Detained children have also been given up for adoption. In a series of court cases, foster families were successfully able to gain full custody of migrant children that they were housing without notifying their parents. Most notably, the agency Bethany Christian Services, an agency that facilitates the care of foster children in Michigan has been under fire for trying to promote the adoption of these migrant children instead of trying to reunite them with their families. In a previous Facebook post, they had waived the previous $550 international adoption application fee for the month of June. This had led to public outcry and protests have been held against this agency and their practices.

This policy in particular has led to the Abolish ICE movement gaining traction in June 2018.

Sanctuary cities
Sanctuary cities are cities that limit their cooperation with ICE ERO, particularly in regards to illegal migrants arrested for state criminal violations. When an undocumented non-citizen is arrested by state or local police for criminal offenses, their information is placed into a federal database that ERO officers can access. In a non-sanctuary city, ERO Officers can ask the police to hold that person after they would normally have been released until ERO can pick them up. However, sanctuary cities believe this is unconstitutional and view being an illegal immigrant as not a crime but a civil violation. As such, policies or ordinances in these cities prevent the police from continuing to hold a person based on an ERO request if that person was otherwise cleared for release.

Sanctuary cities were one of the many focal points for the Trump administration's attempts to reform the country's immigration policies. In early 2017, President Trump issued an executive order to deny sanctuary cities federal grants if they did not comply with ICE. By November 2017, this order was struck down by the United States District Court for the Northern District of California. Despite this, the Trump administration continued to seek ways to challenge sanctuary cities, such as implementing a policy that preferentially awards policing grants that cooperate with ICE.

The label or name "sanctuary city" is not one used by the cities involved, rather by critics of the cities.

Protests

Numerous protests have emerged across the nation in response to the Trump administration's ICE policies. Many of the protesters are occupying areas around ICE facilities in hopes of disrupting operations. The Occupy ICE movement began on June 17, 2018, outside Portland, Oregon. It initially began as a vigil for the people suffering from ICE policies but spontaneously grew into a larger movement as more people showed up. The movement ultimately spread into other major cities like Philadelphia, San Francisco, San Diego, and New York. As the movement grew, they faced counter protesters and arrests, but protesters remained undeterred and vowed to continue fighting the Trump administration's ICE policies. As Occupy ICE groups spread to different cities, there has also been a greater amount of coordination between them. Other grassroots protests have sprung up across the nation as well. On August 1, 2019, a month-long peaceful protest event was started outside the San Francisco ICE office, where protesters beat drums and demanded that family separation at the border be stopped. In addition to blocking ICE facilities, protesters are also protesting technology companies such as Microsoft for providing technology to aid ICE. One such instance of this was the sit in at the Microsoft store on 5th Avenue in NYC led by Close the Camps NYC on September 14, 2019. In the 2020 protests and riots in Portland, Oregon and other cities, ICE was attacked numerous times by protesters, costing Portland an estimated million in damage.

See also

Asylum shopping
Dillingham Commission
Diplomatic Security Service (DSS)—U.S. Department of State
Drug Enforcement Administration
Federal Air Marshal Service
Federal Protective Service (U.S.)
List of United States federal law enforcement agencies
Operation Endgame
Operation Front Line
Operation Protect Our Children
Operation Tangled Web
Title 19 of the Code of Federal Regulations
United States Border Patrol
U.S. Customs and Border Protection
United States Citizenship and Immigration Services
U.S. Marshals Service
U.S. Secret Service
Jaime Zapata (U.S. agent)

Comparable international agencies
Australian Border Force
Canada Border Services Agency
Immigration Enforcement – a Home Office division in the United Kingdom
Customs Surveillance Service – Spain (only customs enforcement; immigration issues are handled by the standard National Police and Guardia Civil)
Frontex – European Union (Schengen Area)
Federal Migration Service (FMS) – Russia

References

External links

U.S. Immigration and Customs Enforcement in the Federal Register
U.S. Customs and Border Protection

 
2003 establishments in Washington, D.C.
Government agencies established in 2003
History of immigration to the United States
Immigration to the United States
Organizations based in Washington, D.C.
United States Department of Homeland Security agencies